Scioto County is a county located along the Ohio River in the south central region of the U.S. state of Ohio. As of the 2020 census, the population was 74,008.  Its county seat is Portsmouth. The county was founded March 24, 1804, from Adams County and is named for a Native American word referring to deer or deer-hunting. Scioto County comprises the Portsmouth, OH Micropolitan Statistical Area.  It is located at the confluence of the Scioto and Ohio rivers.

Geography
Many parts of Scioto County are heavily forested, especially in the western half of the county with Shawnee State Park.

Adjacent counties
 Pike County (north)
 Jackson County (northeast)
 Lawrence County (southeast)
 Greenup County, Kentucky (south)
 Lewis County, Kentucky (southwest)
 Adams County (west)

National protected area
 Wayne National Forest (part)

Other parks
The county also has numerous parks and recreational areas in each of its townships, including Earl Thomas Conley Park on U.S. 52 west of Portsmouth. Public lands in the county also include the Wayne National Forest on the Ironton Ranger District. The  forest encompasses almost  in three townships in Scioto County (Vernon , Green township , and Bloom 4,008.29 acres).

Within the city limits of Portsmouth, there are fourteen parks for the residents and for community use.  These parks include Alexandria Park (Ohio and Scioto River confluence), Allard Park (Bonser Avenue in Sciotoville), Bannon Park (near Farley Square), Branch Rickey Park (on Williams Street near levee), Buckeye Park (near Branch Rickey Park), Cyndee Secrest Park (Sciotoville), Dr. Hartlage Park (Rose Street in Sciotoville), Labold Park (near Spartan Stadium), Larry Hisle Park (23rd Street and Thomas Avenue), Mound Park (17th and Hutchins Streets), York Park (riverfront), Spartan Stadium, Tracy Park (Chillicothe and Gay Streets), and Weghorst Park (Fourth and Jefferson Streets).

Demographics

2000 census
As of the census of 2000, there were 79,195 people, 30,871 households, and 21,362 families residing in the county. The population density was 129 people per square mile (50/km2). There were 34,054 housing units at an average density of 56 per square mile (21/km2). The racial makeup of the county was 94.88% White, 2.73% Black or African American, 0.63% Native American, 0.24% Asian, 0.02% Pacific Islander, 0.18% from other races, and 1.31% from two or more races. 0.60% of the population were Hispanic or Latino of any race.

There were 30,871 households, out of which 31.80% had children under the age of 18 living with them, 52.30% were married couples living together, 13.10% had a female householder with no husband present, and 30.80% were non-families. 26.90% of all households were made up of individuals, and 12.50% had someone living alone who was 65 years of age or older. The average household size was 2.45 and the average family size was 2.96.

In the county, the population was spread out, with 24.40% under the age of 18, 9.60% from 18 to 24, 28.30% from 25 to 44, 22.70% from 45 to 64, and 14.90% who were 65 years of age or older. The median age was 37 years. For every 100 females, there were 95.30 males. For every 100 females age 18 and over, there were 91.20 males.

The median income for a household in the county was $28,008, and the median income for a family was $34,691. Males had a median income of $32,063 versus $21,562 for females. The per capita income for the county was $15,408. About 15.20% of families and 19.30% of the population were below the poverty line, including 25.40% of those under age 18 and 12.80% of those age 65 or over.

2010 census
As of the 2010 United States Census, there were 79,499 people, 30,870 households, and 20,911 families residing in the county. The racial makeup of the county was 94.4% white, 2.7% black or African American, 0.5% American Indian, 0.3% Asian, 0.3% from other races, and 1.7% from two or more races. Those of Hispanic or Latino origin made up 1.1% of the population. In terms of ancestry, 22.9% were German, 15.0% were Irish, 12.1% were American, and 10.1% were English.

Of the 30,870 households, 32.2% had children under the age of 18 living with them, 48.8% were married couples living together, 13.7% had a female householder with no husband present, 32.3% were non-families, and 27.4% of all households were made up of individuals. The average household size was 2.46 and the average family size was 2.96. The median age was 38.8 years.

The median income for a household in the county was $32,812 and the median income for a family was $44,122. Males had a median income of $40,876 versus $29,675 for females. The per capita income for the county was $17,778. About 16.4% of families and 20.8% of the population were below the poverty line, including 28.4% of those under age 18 and 11.8% of those age 65 or over.

Politics
This county is a bit of a swing county, as most elections prior to 2016 were won by close margins. However, Donald Trump won well over 60% of the county's vote in 2016, and 71% in 2020.

|}

Government

Portsmouth is the county seat for Scioto County; the county courthouse is located at the corner of Sixth and Court streets. It was designed by John Scudder Adkins and constructed in 1936 during the Great Depression as a public works project . The county jail, once located in the courthouse, is now located in a new facility at the site of the former Norfolk and Western rail depot, near U.S. 23. It was constructed in 2006.

Scioto County is the site of the state's Southern Ohio Correctional Facility, which is located in Lucasville. The facility is Ohio's only maximum security prison and is the site of Ohio's death house, where death row inmates are executed.

The county maintenance garage is also located in Lucasville.

County officials
 Scioto County Commissioners:  Scottie Powell (R), Cathy Coleman (R), and Bryan Davis (R).
 Scioto County Engineer:  Darren LeBrun (R)
 Auditor:  David L. Green (D)
 Treasurer:  William K. Ogg (D)
 Recorder:  Gail Alley (D)
 Clerk of Courts:  Kathy Shupert (R)
 Sheriff:  David Thoroughman (R)
 Prosecutor: Shane Tieman (R)

Source

Economy

Scioto County's economy has been strongly based on that of Portsmouth after heavy industry replaced agriculture and river trade as most important. Through the early 20th century and until the 1970s, heavy industry such as steel mills and shoe factories drove the county's economy. Since the closure of these factories, Scioto County has suffered a loss of jobs and revenue.

In the early 21st century, the service industry and healthcare, such as the Southern Ohio Medical Center (SOMC), is the largest employer in the county. Scioto County is home to the newest state university in Ohio, Shawnee State University. Shawnee State enrolls between 3,300 and 4,000 students and grants associate, baccalaureate and master's degrees. Much of the recent economic growth and change in the county is related to SOMC and Shawnee State University. Recently Infra-Metals announced the development of a new steel shipping/fabrication site in New Boston, Ohio in the Bob Walton Industrial Park. This plant is under construction and will have access to both barge and rail loading facilities.

In November 2002, the Portsmouth Uranium Enrichment Plant in nearby Piketon was recognized as an ANS Nuclear Historic Landmark by the American Nuclear Society. It had served a military function from 1952 until the mid-1960s, when the mission changed from enriching uranium for nuclear weapons to one focused on producing fuel for commercial nuclear power plants. The Portsmouth Uranium Enrichment Plant ended enriching operations in 2001. It began to support operational and administrative functions and perform external contract work. All uranium enrichment in the area has been taken over by a sister plant located in Paducah, Kentucky. Uranium enrichment functions had been shared by the two plants. USEC interests in the area remain strong, and the American Centrifuge Plant was constructed in the first decade of the 21st century in Piketon. This commercial uranium enrichment facility was expected to employ up to 500 people and reach an initial annual production level of 3.5 million SWU by 2010.

Scioto County has also been the benefactor of Suncoke (coke (fuel) production). Sole Choice, Inc., the largest manufacturer of shoelaces in the world, is located in the county. Graf Brothers Flooring and Lumber, the world's largest manufacturer of rift and quartered oak products, has two satellite log yards in the county. The company's main office is located across the river in South Shore, Kentucky.

Education

Colleges and universities
The Ohio University Southern Campus was located in Scioto County until the early 1980s when it was relocated to  Lawrence County (Ironton). The former Ohio University buildings were used by Shawnee State Community College. The curriculum and facilities were developed to a full four-year undergraduate program and graduate studies, being established in 1986 as Shawnee State University from the former Scioto County Technical College, Ohio's thirteenth and newest institution of higher education.

K–12 schools
Scioto County has ten public school districts , one career technical center, one private school system, and one charter school system, as well as several Christian schools. These districts include Bloom-Vernon (South Webster), Clay, Green, Minford, New Boston, Northwest, Notre Dame (Catholic), Portsmouth, Scioto County Career Technical Center (serving both K–12 and post-secondary students), Sciotoville Community School/East HS (charter), Valley, Washington-Nile (Ports. West) and Wheelersburg.

See also Ohio High School Athletic Association and Southern Ohio Conference

Libraries
The Portsmouth Public Library was established as a Carnegie library in 1906. It now has four branch facilities and a bookmobile to serve the county as well. The library has branches in Lucasville, New Boston, South Webster and Wheelersburg.

Transportation

Highways
Scioto County is served by two major highways, the north–south U.S. 23 and the east–west U.S. 52. Other routes include SR 73, SR 104, SR 125, SR 139, SR 140, SR 335, SR 348, SR 522, SR 728, SR 776, and SR 823.

Rail

Norfolk Southern offers a railyard for long-distance shipping and is currently reopening the repair shops. Amtrak offers a passenger service to the Portsmouth/Scioto County area under the Cardinal route. The passenger station is located in South Shore, Kentucky, across the Ohio River.

Air

Public transportation
Public transportation for Scioto County is offered through Access Scioto County (ASC).

Media

Scioto County is a dividing line of numerous television markets, which includes the Columbus, Cincinnati and Huntington-Charleston markets. Local television stations include: WSAZ-NBC,(channel 3.1) WZAS-myNetwork (myZtv channel 3.2), WOWK-CBS (channel 13.1), WCHS-ABC (channel 8.1) and WQCW, a CW affiliate with an office in Portsmouth and Charleston, and more recently WTZP "The Zone" which is an America One Affiliate that offers a larger amount of local programming such as news, high school sports, community events and locally produced shows about the area. Local radio stations WIOI, WPYK, WNXT, and WZZZ serve the radio listeners in the county and surrounding areas.

The county is also served by three newspapers. The Portsmouth Daily Times is the county's only daily newspaper. The Community Common is a free bi-weekly newspaper, and the Scioto Voice is a weekly newspaper that is mailed to subscribers. The University Chronicle is the student-led newspaper at Shawnee State University.

Of these only three are actually locally owned and operated (WTZP, WIOI, and The Scioto Voice).

Sports

Professional
Scioto County had a series of semi-pro football teams in the 1920s and 1930s, the most notable being the Portsmouth Shoe-Steels, whose roster included player-coach Jim Thorpe. From 1929 to 1933, Portsmouth was home to a professional football team, The Portsmouth Spartans. This team later became the NFL franchise Detroit Lions in 1934. The Portsmouth Spartans also competed in the first professional football night game versus the Green Bay Packers in 1930.

On the baseball front, the Portsmouth Explorers were one of the original teams in the Frontier League, a non-affiliated minor league baseball organization.  The Explorers played in the league's first three seasons, from 1993 to 1995. In 1938, Portsmouth was also the home of the Portsmouth Red Birds, a minor league team owned by the St. Louis Cardinals.

Collegiate
Shawnee State University (SSU) is a member of the National Association of Intercollegiate Athletics (NAIA-Division II). SSU has participated in 24 National Championships in 6 of 11 sponsored sports. The university's women's basketball team has won an NAIA National Title in 1999 and finished in the final four in 1995.  The softball team has had national exposure as well, reaching the "Sweet 16" on several occasions.  The team finished 10th in 1992, 8th in 1995, 9th in 1996, and 9th in 2001.

Amateur
The twelve local high schools, the other educational institutions, the adult leagues, and the development leagues (e.g. AAU and club organizations) generate a great deal of participation as either participants or as followers of sports' teams. The teams have made 60 trips to the Ohio High School Athletic Association championships, winning 19 state titles. These have included four softball titles (Clay HS in 1980, 1981, & 1983 and Wheelersburg HS in 2016); five baseball titles (East HS in 1973, Valley HS in 1975, and Wheelersburg HS in 1996, 2012, and 2013); four football titles (two by Notre Dame HS in 1967 and 1970 and two by Wheelersburg HS in 1989 and 2017); and six boys' basketball titles (1931, 1961, 1978, and 1988 by Portsmouth HS and 2006 by South Webster HS).

Culture
The Vern Riffe Arts Center, on the campus of Shawnee State University, hosts many local and traveling performances, including Broadway plays and Miss Ohio pageants.  Scioto County is home to the Boneyfiddle Historical District (which is on the National Register of Historic Places), SSU's Clark Planetarium, the 1810 House, Greenup Locks & Dam, the Philip Moore Stone House, Roy Rogers' Memorabilia Exhibit, the Southern Ohio Museum and Spartan Municipal Stadium.

Events
Scioto County is best known for Portsmouth's "River Days" activities that include a parade, a pageant associated with the local high schools, boat races on the Ohio River (in the past), musical performances and a carnival. River Days occurs on Labor Day (the first Monday of September) weekend with the activities beginning on Thursday evening and the parade and pageant on Saturday.

The Scioto County Fair is held on the first full week of August of each year. It is one of the largest in the state, drawing approximately 75,000 visitors each year (with the single-day record being 17,000). The first county fair was held in 1828; in 1908 Lucasville became the official site when three fairs (Mount Joy, Portsmouth and Lucasville) merged into one. The Roy Rogers' Homecoming Festival is held each June, and the county has numerous fireworks displays on the

Communities

City
 Portsmouth (county seat)

Villages
 New Boston
 Otway
 Rarden
 South Webster

Townships

 Bloom
 Brush Creek
 Clay
 Green
 Harrison
 Jefferson
 Madison
 Morgan
 Nile
 Porter
 Rarden
 Rush
 Union
 Valley
 Vernon
 Washington

https://web.archive.org/web/20160715023447/http://www.ohiotownships.org/township-websites

Census-designated places

 Clarktown
 Franklin Furnace
 Friendship
 Lucasville
 McDermott
 Minford
 Rosemount
 Sciotodale
 West Portsmouth
 Wheelersburg

Unincorporated communities

 Alexandria
 Bear Creek
 Bloom Junction
 Buena Vista
 Dry Run
 Eifort‡
 Hales Creek
 Harrison Mills
 Haverhill
 Henley
 Junior Furnace
 Lombardsville
 Lyra
 McGaw
 Mount Joy
 Mule Town
 Pinkerman
 Pond Run
 Powellsville
 Rushtown
 Scioto Furnace
 Sedan
 Slocum
 Wallace Mills

Notable residents
 Dale Bandy, former Ohio University basketball coach
 Kathleen Battle, opera singer
 Al Bridwell, former Major League Baseball player
 Earl Thomas Conley, country music singer and writer
 Martin Dillon, musician
 Chuck Ealey, football player
 Steve Free, award-winning folk singer, Governors Award Winner 2008
 Bob Haney, former player and coach for The University of South Carolina Basketball Team
 Bill Harsha, congressman
 Larry Hisle, former Major League Baseball player, currently in Milwaukee Brewers organization
 Rocky Nelson, former Major League Baseball player
 Josh Newman, former Major league pitcher for the Colorado Rockies and Kansas City Royals
 Al Oliver, former Major League Baseball player
 Branch Rickey, baseball executive
 Vern Riffe, Ohio politician (1959–95), Speaker of the Ohio House of Representatives (1975–94)
 Brett Roberts, former NBA player
 Barbara Robinson, author
 Roy Rogers, singer and cowboy movie star
 Ted Strickland, former U.S. Representative from Ohio and former Governor of Ohio
 Gene Tenace, former Major League Baseball player

See also
 National Register of Historic Places listings in Scioto County, Ohio
 Scioto Company (1787 - 1790)

References

External links
 Scioto County official website
 Clay Local School District
  Ohio History Central (Ohio Historical Society)
 Southern Ohio Museum

 
Appalachian Ohio
Counties of Appalachia
Ohio counties on the Ohio River
1803 establishments in Ohio
Populated places established in 1803